Achaea albifimbria is a species of moth of the family Erebidae first described by Francis Walker in 1869. It is found in Cameroon, the Democratic Republic of the Congo, Gabon, Nigeria, Sierra Leone and Uganda.

References

Achaea (moth)
Moths of Africa
Lepidoptera of West Africa
Insects of Uganda
Moths described in 1869